The Cowan Pottery Studio was founded by R. Guy Cowan in Lakewood, Ohio, United States in 1912. It moved to Rocky River, Ohio in 1920, and operated until 1931, when the financial stress of the Great Depression resulted in its bankruptcy. Cowan Pottery produced both artistic and commercial work in a variety of styles influenced by the Arts and Crafts Movement, Art Deco, Chinese ceramics, and modern sculpture.

During its two decades of operation, a number of well-known Cleveland School artists worked with Cowan at the studio: Elizabeth Anderson, Arthur Eugene Baggs, Alexander Blazys, Paul Bogatay, Edris Eckhardt, Waylande Gregory, A. Drexler Jacobson, Raoul Josset, Paul Manship, José Martin, Herman Matzen, F. Luis Mora, Elmer L. Novotny, Margaret Postgate, Stephen Rebeck, Guy L. Rixford, Viktor Schreckengost, Elsa Vick Shaw, Walter Sinz, Frank N. Wilcox, H. Edward Winter, and Thelma Frazier Winter. With the exception of Guy Cowan, himself, Waylande Gregory designed more pieces for the pottery than anyone else. Among Cowan's finest pieces were three limited edition figures relating to dance, including "Salome" (1928), "The Nautch Dancer," (1930), and "The Burlesque Dancer," (1930). For the last two, Gregory made sketches from the side of the stage of the well-known Ziegfeld Follies star, Gilda Grey, when she was performing in Cleveland.

References

2. Folk, Tom, "Uncommon Cowan Pottery Designs by Waylande Gregory," Journal of the American Art Pottery Association, vol. 30, no. 2 (spring 2014), pp. 14– 20. https://web.archive.org/web/20140519093011/http://aapa.info/2014/05/19/cowan-waylande-gregory/

External links
 Cowan Pottery Museum Associates
 Rocky River Public Library & Cowan Pottery Museum

Art Deco
Companies based in Ohio
Design companies established in 1912
Cuyahoga County, Ohio
American art pottery
Manufacturing companies disestablished in 1931
1912 establishments in Ohio
Cleveland School (arts community)
Manufacturing companies established in 1912
Design companies disestablished in 1931
1931 disestablishments in Ohio